Prince Frederick Charles Alexander of Prussia (29 June 1801 – 21 January 1883) was a younger son of Frederick William III of Prussia. He served as a Prussian general for much of his adult life and became the first Herrenmeister (Grand Master) of the Order of Saint John after its restoration as a chivalric order. Nevertheless, he is perhaps remembered more often for his patronage of art and for his sizable collections of art and armor.

Background and family

Charles was born in Charlottenburg Palace near Berlin, the third son of Frederick William III of Prussia by his wife Louise of Mecklenburg-Strelitz. He was named Frederick Charles Alexander at birth, but came to be known as Charles, because there were several other Fredericks in his family at that time. His father was already King of Prussia by the time of Charles' birth, and both of his elder brothers were to succeed to the throne, while his elder sister Charlotte would marry Tsar Nicholas I of Russia. Charles also had two younger sisters, Alexandra and Louise, and a younger brother, Albert. His male line granddaughter Princess Louise Margaret of Prussia married Prince Arthur, Duke of Connaught and Strathearn, third son of Queen Victoria.

Army career

Prince Charles entered the Prussian army in 1811 at the age of ten, with the rank of lieutenant in a regiment of the guards. In 1819, he became a member of the Prussian Staatsrat. In 1820, he became a major in the First Regiment of Foot Guards. In 1822, he became colonel of the 12th Infantry Regiment. In 1824, he was promoted to major general. In 1830, he commanded the 2nd Guards Division. He was further promoted to lieutenant-general in 1832 and general of infantry in 1844. He served as Inspector-General (1848) and as Generalfeldzeugmeister and chief of the artillery (1854).

Charles served as Governor of Mainz from 1864 to 1866. In 1852, he became Herrenmeister of the Order of Saint John (Bailiwick of Brandenburg).

Marriage and issue
On 26 May 1827 in Charlottenburg, Charles married Princess Marie of Saxe-Weimar-Eisenach, a daughter of Charles Frederick, Grand Duke of Saxe-Weimar-Eisenach and his wife Grand Duchess Maria Pavlovna of Russia. Two years later, in 1829, Marie's younger sister Augusta would marry Charles' older brother, Wilhelm, the future Kaiser.

Charles and Marie had three children together:

The family lived in Wilhelmstrasse, opposite the residence of German Chancellor Otto von Bismarck. In possession of great wealth and a great art collector, his palace contained many art treasures. Charles was also a collector of rare weaponry, and carefully acquired and preserved knives, swords, daggers, rifles, pistols, and revolvers from many different countries and time periods. As a result of his vast collection, one source stated his palace was "one of the most famous repositories of bric-a-brac in Europe...his collection of arms and armor is believed to know no rival save in the great State armories at Turin and Vienna".

Death

Marie died in January 1877, only five months before what would have been the golden jubilee of their wedding. Although they had married for family and dynastic reasons, their marriage had been happy and harmonious, and they had been deeply attached to each other. After her death, Charles aged rapidly, and gradually grew infirm from ailments typical of advancing age. In 1882, his foot slipped while he was getting up from the dinner table, causing him to fall down heavily and fracture his left thighbone. The fall and fracture accentuated his ailments, and it was reported that survival was unlikely. He died in Berlin a few months later, on 21 January 1883, aged 81. His last words were "Long live the Emperor."

At the time of his death, Charles was the only surviving brother of Emperor Wilhelm I. His death disrupted plans for the celebration of the silver wedding anniversary of his nephew, Crown Prince Frederick William, as well as plans for a visit from the Prince and Princess of Wales to Berlin.

Honours 
He received the following decorations and awards:
German honours

Foreign honours

Ancestry

References

External links
 

1801 births
1883 deaths
House of Hohenzollern
Military personnel from Berlin
People from the Province of Brandenburg
Prussian princes
Generals of Infantry (Prussia)
Sons of kings

Grand Crosses of the Order of Saint Stephen of Hungary
Grand Croix of the Légion d'honneur
Knights Grand Cross of the Royal Order of Kalākaua
Recipients of the Order of the Netherlands Lion
Knights Commander of the Military Order of William
Recipients of the Order of St. George of the Third Degree
Knights of the Golden Fleece of Spain
Grand Crosses of the Order of Saint-Charles